Ni Zhiqin (born 14 April 1942) often referred to as Ni Chih-Chin, is a retired Chinese high jumper.

He is known for breaking the world record with 2.29 m on 8 November 1970 in Changsha, but because PR China was not a member of the International Association of Athletics Federations at the time, his record was never ratified.

International competition

References

Ni Zhiqin breaks men's high jump world record 
GANEFO Games. GBR Athletics. Retrieved on 2015-01-14.

1942 births
Living people
Chinese male high jumpers
Sportspeople from Quanzhou
Athletes from Fujian
Athletes (track and field) at the 1974 Asian Games
Asian Games medalists in athletics (track and field)
Asian Games silver medalists for China
Medalists at the 1974 Asian Games
20th-century Chinese people
21st-century Chinese people